Santa Fe Passage is a 1955 American Western film directed by William Witney and starring John Payne, Faith Domergue and Rod Cameron.

Plot
Kirby Randolph (John Payne) is a veteran scout who comes to hate all Indians after being betrayed by a Kiowa chief called Satank (George Keymas), whose massacre killed many men and ruined Kirby's reputation.

Kirby and his partner Sam Beekman (Slim Pickens) are offered work by Jess Griswold (Rod Cameron), who believes a man deserves a second chance. Kirby immediately demands that an old Indian woman, Ptewaquin (Irene Tedrow), be ordered off the wagon train, but her young companion Aurelie St. Clair (Faith Domergue) refuses to part ways with her.

Aurelie has a half-interest in a shipment of ammunition being delivered to Mexican soldiers. The antagonism between her and Kirby changes to a mutual attraction after Kirby heroically saves several lives along the trail.

Jess, who also loves Aurelie, picks a fight with Kirby by disclosing that the girl is a "half-breed." The two men's differences are forgotten during an attack by Satank's men. A broken leg slows Jess, who volunteers to remain behind and keep fighting while the others escape.

Kirby ends up face-to-face with Satank, who is about to kill him when the old woman, Ptewaquin, saves him by killing the Indian chief at the cost of her own life. Kirby discovers that the woman was Aurelie's mother. His hatred gone, he and Aurelie plan to be married in the manner of her mother's people.

Cast
 John Payne as Kirby Randolph
 Faith Domergue as Aurelie St. Clair
 Rod Cameron as Jess Griswold
 Slim Pickens as Sam Beekman
 Irene Tedrow as Ptewaquin
 George Keymas as Chief Satank
 Leo Gordon as Tuss McLawery
 Anthony Caruso as Chavez

Production
Parts of the film were shot in Snow Canyon State Park.

See also
 List of American films of 1955

References

External links
 
 
 
 
 

1955 films
Films directed by William Witney
1955 Western (genre) films
Republic Pictures films
American Western (genre) films
Films shot in Utah
Trucolor films
Films with screenplays by Henry Wilson Allen
Films based on works by Henry Wilson Allen
1950s English-language films
1950s American films